Luke Staton (born 10 March 1979) is an English former professional footballer who played as a midfielder.

Career
Staton made his single professional appearance in an EFL Cup match between Bolton Wanderers and Gillingham on 21 September 1999.

References

Living people
1979 births
English footballers
England youth international footballers
Association football midfielders
Blackburn Rovers F.C. players
Bolton Wanderers F.C. players
Barry Town United F.C. players
Merthyr Tydfil F.C. players
Gainsborough Trinity F.C. players
Worksop Town F.C. players
Retford Town F.C. players